The Voice UK is a British television music competition to find new singing talent. The sixth series began airing on 7 January 2017, with Emma Willis hosting the main show, and Cel Spellman presenting online spin-off show The V Room. It is the first series to air on ITV since its move from BBC One. will.i.am returned for his sixth series as a coach, Sir Tom Jones also returned to the show after a series hiatus, replacing Paloma Faith, and Jennifer Hudson and Gavin Rossdale joined as new coaches on the show, replacing Boy George and Ricky Wilson. Mo Adeniran won the competition, marking Jennifer Hudson's first and only win as a coach. Additionally, JHud became the first new coach to win on her first attempt, as well as, the first female coach to win a series of the show.

Coaches

On 13 November 2015, Ricky Wilson announced that the fifth series would be his last as a coach. However, on 24 March 2016, it was revealed that he could make a return to the show. On 3 July 2016, coach will.i.am, who had his doubts about returning for his sixth series, confirmed that he will return for the new series. On 5 July 2016, Boy George announced his departure from the show after just one series. Former coach, Sir Tom Jones hinted that he could possibly return to the programme after the show had moved to ITV. On 17 July 2016, another former coach, Jessie J, ruled herself out of returning to The Voice UK for the sixth series, after speculation of her returning to the show. Wilson later confirmed that he would not be involved with the show for series 6 later in the month. On 28 September, the coaching line-up was confirmed as will.i.am, Jennifer Hudson, Gavin Rossdale, with Jones also returning. On her appointment, Hudson commented, "I couldn't be more excited to join the amazing panel of coaches on The Voice UK! The UK has always been so supportive of me since the beginning of my career so I’m really looking forward to sharing my point of view with the contestants and especially Team JHUD. Discovering new artists has always been important to me and the UK has no shortage of talent, so I can only imagine what this experience will be like for everyone involved. I can't wait to get going and start developing each individual’s own sound!"

Emma Willis announced that she would return to present the show alone, without her co-host Marvin Humes' involvement. On 8 August 2016, it was announced that a planned ITV2 unnamed spinoff show had been scrapped. However, in October 2016, it was announced that Cel Spellman would be presenting an online spin-off show titled The V Room and will be available on-demand via ITV Hub and feature exclusive content across social media sites and the show's mobile app.

Teams

Colour key:
  Winner
  Runner-up
  Third place
  Fourth place 
  Eliminated in the Live shows
  Eliminated in the Knockouts
  Artist was stolen by another coach at the Battles
  Eliminated in the Battles

Blind auditions
There was a change to the blind auditions format for 2017; if all the coaches reject an auditionee they keep their back to the singer and will not say what they thought about their performance, as well as not being able to meet them. The blind auditions began filming on 19 October 2016 at dock10, MediaCityUK in Salford.

Each coach has the length of the artist's performance to decide if they want that artist on their team. Should two or more coaches want the same artist, then the artist will choose their coach.

Colour key

Episode 1 (7 January)
The series premiere aired from 8.00pm until 9.35pm.

Group performance: The Voice UK coaches – "Under Pressure"

Episode 2 (14 January)
This episode aired from 8.00pm until 9.30pm.

Episode 3 (21 January)
This episode aired from 8.00pm until 9.30pm.

Episode 4 (28 January)
This episode aired from 8.00pm until 9.30pm.

Episode 5 (4 February)
This episode aired from 8.00pm until 9.30pm.

Episode 6 (11 February)
This episode aired from 8.00pm until 9.20pm.

Episode 7 (18 February)
This episode aired from 8.00pm until 9.20pm.

Battle rounds
Filming for the battles began in December 2016 at MediaCityUK, following the taping of the blind auditions. Each coach has only one steal. The first part of the battle rounds will be broadcast on 25 February 2017 with part two airing on 26 February 2017. The first part of the battle rounds will be broadcast on 25 February 2017 with part two airing on 26 February 2017. First episode aired from 8.30pm until 10.30pm,

Colour key

Live knockouts
For the first time, the knockouts were recorded live, with the remaining six contestants in each team standing on stage together, stepping forward one by one to sing for 90 seconds. Emma Willis, the programme's presenter, commented, "The knockouts are live… Should I be saying this? I don't know if I should, It will be very immediate, when it's pre-recorded, they edit the show and put it out. This time it will be live so everything will be seen." First episode aired from 8.30pm until 9.45pm, second episode aired from 7.45pm until 9.00pm, third episode aired from 8.30 until 9.45pm and fourth and last aired from 7.45pm until 9.00pm.

In a new twist, viewers were able to vote for their favourite acts to go through to the live show, with each coach being able to save one act. Plus, each coach performed during the knockout rounds.

Ep. 1 Musical guest: Sir Tom Jones ("You Can Leave Your Hat On")
Ep. 2 Musical guest: Jennifer Hudson ("Remember Me")
Ep. 3 Musical guest: Bush ('Mad Love')
Ep. 4 Musical guest: will.i.am ("FIYAH")

Live shows
The first live show was broadcast on 18 March 2017, with the second on 25 March, and the third and final live shows aired on 1 and 2 April 2017.

Results summary
Team's colour key
 Team Will
 Team JHud
 Team Tom
 Team Gavin

Result's colour key
 Artist given 'Fast Pass' by their coach and did not face the public vote
 Artist received the most public votes
 Artist received the fewest votes and was eliminated

Live show details

Week 1: Quarter-final (18 March)
This episode aired from 8.30pm to 10.30pm.
Musical guest: Clean Bandit & Zara Larsson ("Symphony")

Week 2: Semi-final (25 March)
This episode aired from 8.30pm to 10:20pm. 
This marks the first time a female coach had more than one artist in the finale, as Jamie Miller and Mo Adeniran both come from Hudson's team.
With the eliminations of Max Vickers and Truly Ford, Gavin Rossdale had no more artists.
Musical guest: Jamiroquai ("Cloud 9")

Week 3: Final (1/2 April)
Saturday 1
This episode aired from 8:30pm to 10:20pm.

Group performance: The Voice UK coaches – "Freedom! '90"
 Musical guests: Pixie Lott & Anton Powers ("Baby")

Sunday 2
This episode aired from 7:00pm to 8:00pm.

Musical guests: John Legend ("Surefire")

Reception

Ratings
The series went "head-to-head" with the new BBC One talent show, Let It Shine, which premiered on 7 January, the same date as The Voice UK's premiere.

References

External links
 Official website

Series 06
Voice UK (series 6)